The Calabarzon babbler (Sterrhoptilus affinis), is a species of bird in the family Zosteropidae. It is endemic to the Philippines. It is only found in Central and Southern Luzon and Catanduanes. Its natural habitat is tropical moist lowland forest.  It previously was considered a subspecies of the black-crowned babbler, (Sterrhoptilus nigrocapitatus). It is differentiated from its Southern counterpart by having a more intense orange chin and olive-toned upper parts..

Description 
EBird describes it as "A fairly small bird of lowland and foothill forest and edge. Has a gray back and cheek with fine pale streaks, dark wings and tail with white outer tail feathers, white underparts, a pale rufous throat, and a black crown. Note the slender black bill. Often joins mixed-species flocks and sometimes hangs upside down while feeding. Somewhat similar to green-backed whistler, especially from below, but smaller, with a pale rufous throat and a black crown. Voice includes a medium-pitched “poo piuu!” with the second note downslurred." It is seen in mixed flocks along with blue-headed fantails, sulphur-billed nuthatches, Philippine bulbuls, lowland white-eyes, yellowish white-eye, flowerpeckers, sunbirds and other forest birds.   

The Calabarzon babbler has been known to interbreed with the golden-crowned babbler in areas where their ranges overlap.

Habitat and Conservation Status 
Its natural habitat is tropical moist lowland forest. It is seen on the undergrowth of primary forests or along forest edge.

References

Calabarzon babbler
Birds of Luzon
Fauna of Catanduanes
Calabarzon babbler